EUROPEUM Institute for European Policy is a non-profit, non-partisan, and independent think-tank focusing on European integration and cohesion. EUROPEUM contributes to policy related to democracy, security, stability, freedom, and solidarity across Europe as well as to active engagement of the Czech Republic in the European Union. EUROPEUM undertakes original research, organizes public events and educational activities, and formulates new ideas and recommendations to improve European and Czech policy-making.

History
EUROPEUM was launched as a civic association by lecturers of the Department of European Studies at the Faculty of Social Sciences, Charles University in Prague, in 1998. The initial aim was to provide the university students with an platform to improve their capacity in regard to European integration. At this stage the association enjoyed the support of the Faculty of Social Sciences and the Tempus program of the European Commission.

Later it became a think tank which focuses on the activities of program, project, publishing and training concerning the European integration matters. EUROPEUM is part of various international networks of policy and research institutes, including EPIN (European Policy Institutes Network) and PPCI (Public Policy Centers Initiative). Vladimír Bartovic is the director of EUROPEUM.

In 2018, EUROPEUM was the third institute in the list of the top think tanks in Central and Eastern Europe developed by the Think Tanks and Civil Societies Program (TTCSP) of the international relations program at the University of Pennsylvania.

Activities
In cooperation with representation of the European Commission in the Czech Republic and the European Parliament office in the Czech Republic, EUROPEUM organizes regularly repeating seminars on current European topics. Debate under the brand of Café Evropa is organized once a month in the European house with the goal of impact on the broadest possible audience. Café Evropa is also organized in regional cities to focus on non-Prague citizens. EUROPEUM also organized a variety of conferences, seminars, expert roundtables, and other publicly closed events.

One of the most important projects is the Prague European Summit, which is regularly repeating forum on highest level touching strategic questions concerning the future of EU, organized in co-operation with the Institute of International Relations. Other important projects are National Convention on the EU, round table platform for professional public organized by the Office of the Government of the Czech Republic or Transatlantic Policy Forum, which is publicly closed summit for decision-makers and opinion-shapers touching various aspects of transatlantic relations in organised co-operation with Center for European Policy Analysis (CEPA).

EUROPEUM's longterm focus is on the education of secondary school students, particularly in the framework of the EuropaSecura competition on EU, NATO and security issues. For 16 consecutive years, EUROPEUM is organizing European Summer School – international summer school Také již 16 let organize European Summer School – mezinárodní letní školu dedicated to EU issues, attended annually by dozens of university students from around the world. In addition to these projects, EUROPEUM also organizes Future Leaders European Evening Talks, a semester series of evening lessons aimed at bringing international experts to discuss EU topics with young leaders.

The last if the mentionable project is Brussel's trips organized by EUROPEUM for young journalists, whose goal is to widen their knowledge and connect with important people in the capital city of the EU.

EUROPEUM is also pretty active in publishing activity. Brussels Monitor, Eastern Monitor, and a variety of policy papers are published regularly through experts who offer insight and recommendations for EU strategy makers in key areas of the EU agenda. EUROPEUM also publishes regularly on their webpage Blog about international events and affairs, publishes articles about partner's projects and regularly contribute to media and publications of other Think Tanks.

Areas of research
EUROPEUM's major areas of research are as follows:

 EU politics, institutions, and budgetary issues: Explaining and analysing their developments and their impact.
 The EU in member states: Assessing expectations and building trust among citizens, the role of the Czech Republic and Central Europe in the EU, and fundamental underpinnings of EU unity.
 Europe as a global actor: EU foreign and defence policy.
 EU enlargement and European Neighbourhood Policy (ENP).

Brussels Office
Building on a long history of EUROPEUM in Prague, the think tank opened its office in Brussels in January 2016. EUROPEUM has been the first think-tank from the Central European region to branch out to the capital of the European Union. Its motivation has been to follow the debates on EU policies and politics more closely and to contribute to them by strengthening the voice of the Czech Republic and other Central and Eastern European countries. Vice versa, the organization aims at establishing a presence in Brussels to reinvigorate EU-related discussions back in Central Europe, by introducing research from Brussels-based experts, by offering its perspective at local events, and by cooperating with the media, among others.

Prague European Summit
As an initiative of EUROPEUM Institute for European Policy and the Institute of International Relations, and under the patronage of the Ministry of Foreign Affairs of the Czech Republic, Office of the Government of the Czech Republic, Representation of the European Commission in the Czech Republic and the City of Prague, the Prague European Summit has been established to trigger a strategic and open debate on the future of the European Union among high-level political representatives, government officials, business representatives, academicians and journalists from the Czech Republic, EU countries, V4 countries and others.

Funders
EUROPEUM has been financially supported by Czech ministry of foreign affairs and the European Commission. In addition, the institute has self-generated income through projects.

References

1998 establishments in the Czech Republic
Organizations based in Prague
Political and economic think tanks based in the European Union
Think tanks established in 1998
Think tanks based in the Czech Republic